Tahlu or Tahloo may refer to:
 Tahlu, Bandar Abbas
 Tahlu, Khamir